The Heart of America 200 is a NASCAR Camping World Truck Series race held at the Kansas Speedway in Kansas City, Kansas.

From 2001 to 2019, the race was one of a few on the Truck Series schedule to be 250 miles (Daytona, Talladega, Texas' 400km event). In 2020, as a result of the COVID-19 pandemic schedule changes, the Truck Series had three races at Kansas with the first two being a doubleheader in July after being postponed from May and the other one being held in the fall. Each of the three races was 200 miles instead of 250. In 2021, the track only had one race again but the race distance remained 200 miles.

History

The inaugural race was run on July 7, 2001, and was won by Ricky Hendrick.

In 2020, the track had three Truck Series races, starting with a doubleheader in July due to the schedule changes caused by the COVID-19 pandemic. The track's third race, the Clean Harbors 200, was added to the schedule as a replacement for the race at Eldora Speedway due to COVID-19. This race, held on the same weekend as the NASCAR Cup Series' playoff race at the track, was added back on the series' schedule as a permanent race in 2022.

In 2021, WillCo Intelligent Stored Energy (WISE) Power became the title sponsor of the race. In 2022, AdventHealth became the new title sponsor of the Cup and Truck Series spring races at Kansas, replacing Busch Beer and WISE Power, respectively. The Cup race was called the AdventHealth 400 but the name of the Truck Series race was decided by a contest for AdventHealth employees. The winning name was "Heart of America".

Past winners

2005, 2016 and 2021: Race extended due to a NASCAR Overtime finish.
2009: Race suspended on Saturday, finished on Monday and shortened due to rain.
2020 I: Race postponed from May 30 to July 24 due to the COVID-19 pandemic. The race distance was shortened from 250 to 200 miles due to the series having a second race at the track the next day.
2020 II: Race moved from Chicagoland Speedway due to the COVID-19 pandemic.

Multiple winners (drivers)

Multiple winners (teams)

Manufacturer wins

References

External links
 

2001 establishments in Kansas
 
NASCAR Truck Series races
Recurring sporting events established in 2001
Annual sporting events in the United States